Theater and opera director Tim Ocel has directed productions for organizations ranging from Opera Theatre of Saint Louis to Shakespeare Santa Cruz to  Geva Theatre in Rochester, New York to the Georgia Shakespeare Festival. He has been artistic director of the Sacramento Theatre Company, artistic associate of Geva Theatre, and an associate professor of opera at the University of Kansas.

Life and career
Raised in Minneapolis, Minnesota, Ocel received his bachelor of theater arts degree from the University of Minnesota Duluth in 1981. In Baltimore, Maryland he worked as a stage manager with the Baltimore Opera Company and the Peabody Conservatory of Music. Also stage managing at Central City Opera, Michigan Opera Theatre, Opera Theatre of Saint Louis, Tulsa Opera, Opera/Omaha, and the Idaho Shakespeare Festival, he was involved with more than 75 productions before accepting a position as Associate Artistic Director of the Sacramento Theatre Company in 1991. Ocel became Artistic Director of STC's 1995-1996 season before moving to St. Louis, Missouri to freelance and reside with his partner, artist and graphic designer Peter Shank.  From 2004 - 2008 he was an Associate Professor of Opera at the University of Kansas in Lawrence KS.  Recently, Mr. Ocel was adjunct faculty at the Conservatory of Theatre Arts at Webster University in St. Louis from 2010 - 2019.  He continues to freelance as a theater director and considers American Players Theatre his artistic home.

External links
 Official Website

Living people
American opera directors
University of Minnesota Duluth alumni
Artists from Minneapolis
American theatre directors
Year of birth missing (living people)